Justice Bunn may refer to:

C. Haley Bunn (born 1985/86), associate justice of the Supreme Court of Appeals of West Virginia
George Bunn (lawyer), associate justice of the Minnesota Supreme Court
Henry Gaston Bunn, chief justice of the Arkansas Supreme Court